Siletz Bay State Airport  is a public airport located one mile (1.6 km) southeast of Gleneden Beach in Lincoln County, Oregon, United States. The airfield is located to the south of its namesake Siletz Bay.

External links
Aerial photo of the airport by "drmargy" at Flickr

Airports in Lincoln County, Oregon